Grace Talbot (September 3, 1901 – March 22, 1971) was an American sculptor. Her work was part of the sculpture event in the art competition at the 1932 Summer Olympics.

References

1901 births
1971 deaths
20th-century American sculptors
American women sculptors
Olympic competitors in art competitions
People from Billerica, Massachusetts
20th-century American women artists